O’Brien v MGN Ltd [2001] EWCA Civ 1279 is an English contract law case, concerning incorporation of terms through reasonable notice.

Facts
The defendant put scratchcards with its newspapers-- Daily Mirror, Sunday Mirror and The People. If the card came up with money, players called a premium rate number to see if the amount matched a mystery bonus cash amount. Mr O’Brien on 3 July 1995 got two sums of £50,000. 1472 other people did as well, because MGN had distributed too many by mistake. MGN had only intended to have one prize of £50,000. MGN held a draw among the 1472. MGN pointed to "Rule 5", which said there would be a draw where more prizes were claimed than available. Rule 5, however, although published in some newspapers, was not to be found in the 3 July 1995 edition. This only said ‘Normal Mirror Group rules apply.’ Mr O’Brien had seen that. The question was whether Rule 5 was incorporated into the scratchcard agreement.

Judgment
Hale LJ held that Rule 5 was incorporated. She noted that Rule 5 was no big burden on the claimant like in Interfoto nor excluding liability for injury like Thornton, but simply deprived a windfall. She also noted that in the test for incorporation, the words ‘onerous or unusual’ are not ‘terms of art’. Potter LJ concurred with Hale LJ.

Sir Anthony Evans was doubtful that judge’s reasons were right and thought the rule was onerous enough to require more notice.

See also
Parker v South Eastern Railway Co (1877) 2 CPD 416
Chapelton v Barry UDC [1940] 1 KB 532
Olley v Marlborough Court Ltd [1949] 1 KB 532
J Spurling Ltd v Bradshaw [1956] 1 WLR 461
Thornton v Shoe Lane Parking Ltd [1971] 2 QB 163.

Notes

English contract case law
Court of Appeal (England and Wales) cases
2001 in case law
2001 in British law
Incorporation case law